Gilbert East Jolliffe was MP for Petersfield in 1830–31.

Jolliffe was the eldest son of the Reverend William John Jolliffe and his wife Julia née Pytches. He served in the army until his election victory.  His younger brother William was the 1st Baron Hylton.

References

1801 births
1833 deaths
19th Light Dragoons officers
Conservative Party (UK) MPs for English constituencies
UK MPs 1830–1831
Gilbert East